Communist Unification Party was a political party in Spain. Later the same year the Communist Organization Workers Information  joined the PCU.

PCU promoted abstention in the 1976 Referendum on the Law of Political Reform.

In 1977 merged into the Party of Labour of Spain (PTE).

References

Political parties established in 1976
Political parties disestablished in 1977
Communist parties in Spain